The Southern Rubber Industry Joint Stock Company, or Casumina, is a tire manufacturer in Vietnam. It has factories in the south of Vietnam producing tyres and inner tubes for bicycles, motorcycles, cars, light truck, trucks, forklifts, and tractors.

Products
 Trucks and light trucks tires and tubes
 Motorbike tires and tubes
 Bike tires and tubes
 Industrial tires and tubes
 Forklift tires
 Agricultural and gardening tires and tubes
 Technical rubber spare parts
 Latex gloves, condoms
 Conveyor belts, V-belts
 Bridge bearings and dock fenders.

In 2009 it produced the following quantities:
 Bicycle tires - 4.0 million (2008 4.19 million)
 Motorcycle tires - 4.95 m (2008 4.68m)
 Car tires - 0.807m (2008 0.682m)
 Motor cycle tubes 20m (2008 16.4m)
 Total sales 2504 billion dong (2152 billion dong)
 Operating profit 328 billion dong (4.66 billion dong)
 Exports US$57.2 million (US$74.6million)

Euromina
Euromina is a brand name of Casumina, created in 2008. Euromina is a product for scooters.

References

External links
Casumina Website 
Casumina products at www.tirecenter.com.ph
Scooter tour guide

Manufacturing companies based in Ho Chi Minh City
Manufacturing companies established in 1976
Cycle parts manufacturers
Tire manufacturers of Vietnam
Vietnamese brands
Vietnamese companies established in 1976